George Dueward Foss (June 13, 1897 – November 10, 1969) was an American Major League Baseball player.

References

External links

1897 births
1969 deaths
Baseball players from Georgia (U.S. state)
Major League Baseball third basemen
Washington Senators (1901–1960) players